The Brewster site is an archaeological site associated with a village of the Mill Creek culture near Cherokee, Iowa, United States. Among the items found here are ceremonial or decorative items manufactured from birds.  Pottery that has been tempered with crushed granite, sand, and pulverized clamshell has also been found. The site was listed on the National Register of Historic Places in 1979.

References

Archaic period in North America
Archaeological sites on the National Register of Historic Places in Iowa
National Register of Historic Places in Cherokee County, Iowa
Geography of Cherokee County, Iowa